"Glad to Know You" is a 1981 dance single by the former keyboard/guitarist for Ian Dury & The Blockheads,  Chaz Jankel.  After previous single releases "3,000,000 Synths" and "Ai No Corrida", "Glad to Know You" reached number one on the US, Billboard Hot Dance Club Play chart, remaining there for seven weeks, and becoming the biggest dance single of 1982. On other US charts, "Glad to Know You", reached number 57 on the US R&B chart. It also reached number 102 on the Bubbling Under Hot 100 chart.

Cover versions
In 1983, Kitty Grant recorded a cover of the song for her second album of the same name.
In 2012, the Venezuelan group, Los Amigos Invisibles recorded an English-language cover.

References

1981 songs
1981 singles
A&M Records singles
Chaz Jankel songs
Dance-pop songs
Disco songs
Songs written by Chaz Jankel
Songs written by Ian Dury